23 Cygni is a single, blue-white hued star in the northern constellation Cygnus. It is a faint star, visible to the naked eye, with an apparent visual magnitude of 5.14. At that distance, the current star would be of magnitude 2.24.

This is an ordinary B-type main-sequence star of spectral type B5V, a star that is generating energy through hydrogen fusion at its core. It is roughly 26 million years old with 4.7 times the mass of the Sun and 4.3 times the Sun's radius. The star has a high rate of spin, having a projected rotational velocity of 145 km/s. It is radiating 612 times the Sun's luminosity from its photosphere at an effective temperature of 14,893 K.

References

B-type main-sequence stars
Cygnus (constellation)
Durchmusterung objects
Cygni, 23
188665
097870
7608